Jared Corey Kushner (born January 10, 1981) is an American businessman, investor, and former government official. From 2017–2021, he served as a senior advisor to President Donald Trump, his father-in-law. He was also Director of the Office of American Innovation.

As senior advisor to President Trump, Kushner was involved in a number of the Trump Administration's domestic and foreign policy priorities. He led the Administration's effort to pass the First Step Act, a criminal justice reform bill signed into law in 2018. Kushner was the primary Trump administration participant for the Middle East Peace Process, authoring the Trump peace plan  and facilitating the talks that led to the signing of the Abraham Accords and other normalization agreements between Israel and various Arab states in 2020.

Kushner played an influential role in the Trump administration's COVID-19 response, and although advising Trump early on in the pandemic that the media was exaggerating its threat, leading the federal effort to procure medical supplies and equipment and to develop a vaccine. He was a leading broker in the US–Mexico–Canada agreement, for which he was awarded honors by the Mexican government.

Since leaving the White House, Kushner founded Affinity Partners, a private equity firm investing in Israeli and American companies expanding in the Middle East, Africa, and Asia. With funds derived from the Saudi government's sovereign wealth fund, among other sources, he describes it as an "investment corridor between Saudi Arabia and Israel", seen internationally as a "sign of warming ties between two historic rivals".
During the 2016 Trump presidential campaign, Kushner helped develop and run Trump's digital media strategy. In 2017, he was named as a senior White House advisor, raising concerns about nepotism. He also stirred controversy for his conflicts of interest, as he continued to engage in business, even profiting on policy proposals that he himself pushed for within the administration. Kushner was unable to obtain Top Secret Security clearance until May 2018, when Trump reportedly intervened on his son-in-law's behalf.

Early life and education
Kushner was born in Livingston, New Jersey, to Seryl Kushner (née Stadtmauer) and Charles Kushner, a real-estate developer and convicted felon. His father was friends with Bill Clinton and Hillary Clinton occasionally attending dinners with them. Kushner also donated to Clinton campaign and endorsed him. His paternal grandparents, Reichel and Joseph Kushner, were Holocaust survivors who came to the U.S. in 1949 from Navahrudak, now in Belarus. During the Holocaust, Reichel led efforts to escape from the Navahrudak Ghetto by digging a tunnel, and later became a member of the Bielski partisans. Morris Stadtmauer was Jared's maternal grandfather.

Raised in a Modern Orthodox Jewish family, Kushner graduated from the Frisch School, a Modern Orthodox yeshiva high school, in 1999. He enrolled at Harvard University in 1999. According to journalist Daniel Golden, Kushner's father, whose foundation gives away millions of dollars a year to various charitable causes, made a donation of $2.5 million to the university in 1998, along with donations to several other universities, not long before Jared was admitted. Several sources quoted in the book subsequently disputed the accuracy of Golden’s reporting, characterizing the claims as “distorted” and “false.” At Harvard, Kushner was elected into the Fly Club, supported the campus Chabad house, and bought and sold real estate in Somerville, Massachusetts, as a vice president of Somerville Building Associates (a division of Kushner Companies), returning a profit of $20 million by its dissolution in 2005. Kushner graduated from Harvard with honors in 2003 with a Bachelor of Arts degree in government.

Kushner enrolled in the joint-J.D./M.B.A. program at New York University School of Law and New York University Stern School of Business, and graduated with both degrees in 2007. Kushner interned at Manhattan District Attorney Robert Morgenthau's office, and with the  New York law firm Paul, Weiss, Rifkind, Wharton & Garrison.

Early Business career 
Following his father's conviction and subsequent incarceration between March 4, 2005, and August 25, 2006, Jared Kushner took a much bigger role in the family real estate business. He set about expanding the business and purchased almost $7 billion in property over the next ten years, much of it in New York City. , Kushner's net worth is estimated at about $800 million.

Real estate 
Kushner was a real-estate investor, and increased Kushner Companies' presence in the New York City real-estate market.

Kushner Companies purchased the office building at 666 Fifth Avenue in 2007, for a then-record price of $1.8 billion, most of it borrowed. He assumed the role of CEO in 2008. Following the property crash that year, the cash flow generated by the property was insufficient to cover its debt service, and the Kushners were forced to sell a controlling stake in the retail footage to The Carlyle Group and Stanley Chera and bring in Vornado Realty Trust as a 50% equity partner in the ownership of the building. By that time, Kushner Companies had lost more than $90 million on its investment. He was the face of the deal but his father Charles Kushner pushed him to do the deal.

In 2011, Kushner purchased a 130,000 square foot office tower at 200 Lafayette Street in Manhattan for $50 million from, selling it two years later for $150 million. On August 18, 2014, Kushner acquired a three-building apartment portfolio in Middle River, Maryland, for $38 million with Aion Partners, later selling the complex for $68 million. In 2013, his company led a transaction to purchase the Jehovah’s Witnesses headquarters in Brooklyn Heights for $375 million and invested $100 million into the site, transforming it into a sprawling office park, and signing online retailer Etsy to a 10-year lease.

In 2013, Kushner co-founded WiredScore, a global organization that provides a digital connectivity certification rating the quality and resilience of digital infrastructure in buildings.

In 2013–2014, he and his company acquired more than 11,000 units throughout New York, New Jersey, and the Baltimore area. In May 2015, he purchased 50.1% of the Times Square Building from Africa Israel Investments Ltd. for $295 million.

In 2014, Kushner, with his brother Joshua and Ryan Williams, co-founded Cadre (now RealCadre LLC), an online real-estate investment platform. His business partners included Goldman Sachs and billionaire George Soros, a top Democratic Party donor. In early 2015, Soros Fund Management financed the startup with a $250 million credit line. Kushner did not identify these business relationships in his January 2017 government financial-disclosure form. He did, however, disclose his ownership of BFPS Ventures, the company that housed his stake in Cadre. In 2020, his ownership stake in Cadre was estimated at $25–50 million.

Newspaper publishing 

In 2006, Kushner purchased The New York Observer, a weekly New York City newspaper, for $10 million, outcompeting a bid by Trifecta Enterprises, a group headed by Robert De Niro. To make the bid, Kushner used money he says he earned during his college years by closing deals on residential buildings he purchased in Somerville, Massachusetts, with family members providing the backing for his investments. The buildings, which he purchased for $8.3 million in 2000, sold four years later for $13 million.

After purchasing the Observer, Kushner published it in tabloid format. Since then, he has been credited with increasing the Observers online presence and expanding the Observer Media Group. With no substantial experience in journalism, Kushner could not establish a good relationship with the newspaper's veteran editor-in-chief, Peter W. Kaplan. "This guy doesn't know what he doesn't know", Kaplan remarked about Kushner, to colleagues, at the time. As a result of his differences with Kushner, Kaplan quit his position. Kaplan was followed by a series of short-lived successors until Kushner hired Elizabeth Spiers in 2011. It has been alleged that Kushner used the Observer as propaganda against rivals in real estate. Spiers left the newspaper in 2012. In January 2013, Kushner hired a new editor-in-chief, Ken Kurson. Kurson had been a consultant to Republican political candidates in New Jersey.

According to Vanity Fair, under Kushner, the "Observer has lost virtually all of its cultural currency among New York's elite, but the paper is now profitable and reporting traffic growth ... [it] boasts 6 million unique visitors per month, up from 1.3 million in January 2013". In April 2016, the New York Observer became one of only a handful of newspapers to officially endorse United States presidential candidate Donald Trump in the Republican primary, but the paper ended the campaign period by choosing not to back any presidential candidate at all.

Kushner stepped down from his newspaper role in January 2017 to pursue a role in President Donald Trump's administration. He was replaced by his brother-in-law, Joseph Meyer.

Politics

Political background 
Jared Kushner had been a lifelong Democrat prior to his father-in-law Donald Trump entering politics. He had donated over $10,000 to Democratic campaigns starting at the age of 11. In 2008, he donated to the campaign for Hillary Clinton and his newspaper the New York Observer endorsed Barack Obama over John McCain in the 2008 United States presidential election. After expressing disappointment with Obama, however, he registered as an independent in 2009 and endorsed Republican U.S. presidential nominee Mitt Romney in 2012 via the New York Observer. In 2014 he continued to donate to Democratic groups, but he then continued his "ideological conversion" by joining his father-in-law Donald Trump's nascent US presidential campaign in the field of the Republican candidates in 2015. Kushner had no prior involvement in campaign politics or in government before Trump's campaign.

Presidential campaign 

From the outset of the presidential campaign of his father-in-law Donald Trump, Kushner was the architect of Trump's digital, online, and social media campaigns, enlisting talent from Silicon Valley to run a 100-person social-media team dubbed "Project Alamo." The digital team tested more than one hundred thousand ad combinations a week, raising more than $250 million in small-dollar donations in the closing months of the campaign. Andrew Bosworth, Facebook’s top advertising executive during the 2016 campaign cycle, called it the “single best digital ad campaign I’ve ever seen from any advertiser.”

Kushner, together with Paul Manafort and Brad Parscale, hired Steve Bannon's firm Cambridge Analytica to support the Trump campaign. Kushner has also helped as a speechwriter, and was tasked with working to establish a plan for Trump's White House transition team. He was for a time seen as Trump's de facto campaign manager, succeeding Corey Lewandowski, who was fired in part on Kushner's recommendation in June 2016. He had been intimately involved with campaign strategy, coordinating Trump's visit in late August to Mexico, and he is believed to be responsible for the choice of Mike Pence as Trump's running mate. Kushner's "sprawling digital fundraising database and social media campaign" has been described as "the locus of his father-in-law's presidential bid."

According to former Google CEO Eric Schmidt (who worked on technology for Hillary Clinton's campaign), Kushner's role in the 2016 election was its biggest surprise. Schmidt told Forbes, "Best I can tell, he actually ran the campaign and did it with essentially no resources." Federal Election Commission filings indicate the Trump campaign spent $343 million, about 59 percent as much as the Clinton campaign.

On July 5, 2016, Kushner wrote an open letter in the New York Observer addressing the controversy around a tweet from the Trump campaign containing allegedly anti-Semitic imagery. He was responding to his own paper's editorial by Dana Schwartz criticizing Kushner's involvement with the Trump campaign. In the letter, Kushner wrote, "In my opinion, accusations like 'racist' and 'anti-Semite' are being thrown around with a carelessness that risks rendering these words meaningless." His estranged cousin Marc responded to the op-ed on Facebook that his lesson from the story of his grandparents was to renounce hate.

Presidential transition 

During the presidential transition, Kushner was said to be his father-in-law's "confidant," and one of Donald Trump's closest advisors, even more so than Trump's four adult children. Trump was reported to have requested the top-secret security clearance for him to attend the presidential daily intelligence briefings as his staff-level companion, along with General Mike Flynn, who already had the clearance prior to his resignation.

Senior Advisor to the President 

On January 9, 2017, Kushner was named Senior Advisor to the President (formally, "Assistant to the President and Senior Advisor"). He consequently resigned as CEO of Kushner Companies, and as publisher of the Observer.

After Donald Trump became President-elect, Kushner and his wife met with the Japanese prime minister and other Japanese officials, while his wife was conducting a licensing deal between her namesake clothing brand and Sanei International, a company whose investors include the Japanese government’s development bank. Although negotiations around the deal had begun in 2015, well before Donald Trump secured the Republican nomination for president, Ivanka backed out of the deal to avoid the appearance of a conflict of interest. She sat in on a meeting between her father, then-president-elect Donald Trump, and Japan's prime minister, Shinzō Abe.

In late March 2017, Kushner was also given the new role of leading the "White House Office of American Innovation", where Kushner reportedly has been focusing on improving governmental efforts with regard to Veterans Affairs, information-technology contracting, and the opioid crisis.

Kushner helped broker the sale of $100+ billion of arms to Saudi Arabia, and during a meeting with Saudi officials at the White House to finalize the deal, he called Lockheed Martin CEO Marillyn Hewson to ask for a lower price on a radar system to detect ballistic missiles.

Kushner underwent a series of steps to comply with government ethics requirements, conferring with the Office of Government Ethics during the presidential transition and divesting of foreign investments, all common stock, and more than 35 other assets. Kushner's business activities in China drew press scrutiny for mixing government with business. Kushner's investments in real estate and financial services have also drawn controversy for conflicts of interest. In May, the Wall Street Journal reported that he had failed to disclose all required financial information in his security clearance applications, including that he owes $1 billion in loans. While noting that “it is difficult to calculate net worth” using financial disclosure forms, the Washington Post estimated that during 2017, Kushner and his wife Ivanka Trump made $82 million in outside income at the same time that they served as senior White House advisors. Kushner and his wife’s lawyers asserted that their net worth had largely remained the same. In March 2020, the Associated Press reported that Kushner had sold stakes in a firm that had benefitted from the same Opportunity Zone tax breaks—incentives for new investment in low-income communities—that Kushner pushed for as a senior White House advisor.

In a statement, Abbe Lowell, Kushner's lawyer, admitted that Kushner had intermittently used private e-mail for official White House business. No classified or privileged information was used on this account. During the campaign for the 2016 presidential election, Trump repeatedly criticized his opponent Hillary Clinton for her use of personal e-mail in her role as Secretary of State, which involved the transmission of classified information over a server Clinton had set up in her basement.

In an HBO/Axios interview released in June 2019, Kushner denied that President Trump was a racist. When asked whether birther conspiracy theories about President Obama (which Trump pushed extensively for a number of years) were racist, Kushner did not answer, saying instead twice, "Look, I wasn't really involved in that." In the interview, Kushner, whose grandparents survived the holocaust and later immigrated to America, spoke of his own family's immigration history: "It's a great reminder of how great this country is." In the same interview, he defended the Trump administration's decision to drastically reduce the number of refugees accepted by the United States (the lowest level in 40 years).

Firing of Chris Christie 
Kushner was reportedly an influential factor behind the firing of New Jersey governor Chris Christie as head of the transition team, as well as the dismissal from the Donald Trump transition team of anyone connected to Christie. An anonymous source familiar with the transition told Politico, "Jared doesn't like Christie... He's always held [the prosecution of his father] against Christie." Kushner told Forbes that the reports that he was involved in Christie's dismissal were false: "Six months ago, Governor Christie and I decided this election was much bigger than any differences we may have had in the past, and we worked very well together. ... I was not behind pushing out him or his people." In his memoir Christie said that Steve Bannon fired him at Trump Tower but that Kushner had his ordered firing as a revenge for what Christie had done to Kushner's father Charles Kushner for several felonies.

Russia investigation 

Kushner's contacts with Russian officials came under scrutiny as part of the larger federal investigation into Russian interference in the election.  Before meeting with the Senate and House intelligence committees, Kushner delivered an 11 page document describing his contacts with Russian figures during the campaign and after the election.  The Wall Street Journal called it "comprehensive disclosure" and said it "introduced a useful precedent to the Trump presidency"

Kushner has said he had four meetings with Russians during the 2016 campaign and presidential transition, and that none of those Russian contacts were improper.

In June 2016, an agent of Emin Agalarov reportedly offered Donald Trump Jr., Kushner's brother-in-law, compromising information on Hillary Clinton from the Russian government if he met with a lawyer connected to the Kremlin. A meeting took place on June 9, 2016, and included Kushner, Trump Jr., and Paul Manafort, who was then chairman of the presidential campaign, who met with Natalia Veselnitskaya at Trump Tower. According to Rinat Akhmetshin, who was also present at the meeting, Veselnitskaya claimed to have evidence of "violations of Russian law by a Democratic donor", and that the "Russian lawyer described her findings at the meeting and left a document about them with Trump Jr. and the others". According to the Mueller Report, Kushner arrived at the meeting and quickly grew aggravated, texting Paul Manafort that it was a “waste of time,” and emailing two different assistants to call him so he would have an excuse to leave the meeting. Investigators did not identify any follow up from the meeting. The Democratic National Committee cyber attacks were revealed later that week.

Between April and November 2016, Kushner had two undisclosed phone calls with the Russian ambassador, Sergey I. Kislyak. (In May 2017, Kushner's attorney Jamie Gorelick told Reuters that Kushner had participated in "thousands of calls in this time period" and did not recall any with Kislyak.) In December 2016, Kushner met with Kislyak. That month, U.S. intelligence officials who were monitoring Kislyak reportedly overheard him relaying to Moscow a request from Kushner to establish a "secret and secure communications channel" with the Kremlin using Russian diplomatic facilities. Kislyak reportedly was "taken aback by the suggestion of allowing an American to use Russian communications gear at its embassy or consulate – a proposal that would have carried security risks for Moscow as well as the Trump team".

Also in December 2016, Kushner met with Sergey N. Gorkov, a trained Russian spy who then headed Vnesheconombank (VEB), a Russian state-owned bank. Former White House press secretary Sean Spicer said that Kushner met with Gorkov briefly as part of his role in the transition, and as a diplomatic conduit to the State Department. However, VEB has stated that Gorkov met with Kushner on a private matter concerning his family's real estate corporation, Kushner Companies, even though VEB has been under international sanctions since July 2014. The Mueller investigation examined this meeting and could not confirm VEB’s account. The Mueller report did state, however, that it was unable to find evidence that there was any follow up between Kushner and Gorkov after the meeting.

In July 2017, Kushner appeared before both the House and Senate intelligence committees in closed session as part of their investigations into Russian meddling in the 2016 election. He also released a public statement. In October 2017, the Senate Judiciary Committee requested numerous documents from Kushner. Kushner's attorneys gave the committee many documents on November 3, but the committee followed up on November 16 with a request for many additional documents it said had not been produced.

In early November 2017, Kushner was interviewed by investigators from Special Counsel Robert Mueller's office. Reportedly the interview focused on former national security advisor Michael Flynn. On December 1, Flynn pleaded guilty to one count of lying to the FBI, as part of a plea bargain. Bloomberg reported that Kushner is most likely the "senior member of the Trump transition team," mentioned in Flynn's plea documents, who is said to have ordered Flynn to contact Russia.

Mueller investigated meetings between Trump associates including Kushner and George Nader, an emissary representing the crown princes of the United Arab Emirates (UAE) and Saudi Arabia. In August 2016, Nader offered help to the Trump presidential campaign. In December 2016, Nader attended a New York meeting between the United Arab Emirates officials and Kushner, Michael Flynn and Steve Bannon. Mueller also investigated Kushner's possible ties to Qatar, Israel and China. Two months after the Mueller report was released, Kushner’s top secret security clearance was permanently restored.

Since the electoral defeat of his father-in-law, Donald J. Trump, Kushner has stayed active in the region through a nonprofit organization he established.he took a special interest in the petroleum-rich monarchies of the Persian Gulf. Kushner attempted to raise money from the Persian Gulf states for a new investment firm he has founded.

The transcript of Kushner's interview with FBI investigators was not publicly released in January 2020 as ordered by a federal judge, as the Justice Department stated it required a security review by an unnamed intelligence agency. The transcript was released on February 3, redacted nearly in its entirety.

In June 2019, Republicans and Democrats on the Senate Intelligence Community made a criminal referral of Kushner to federal prosecutors on concerns that his testimony was contradicted by Richard Gates, a former Trump campaign aides, although the referral did not accuse Kushner of making false statements.

Criminal justice reform — FIRST STEP Act 
Kushner was a strong supporter within the Trump administration for the bipartisan criminal justice reform bill Formerly Incarcerated Reenter Society Transformed Safely Transitioning Every Person Act (FIRST STEP ACT) which President Trump signed into law in December 2018. The legislation implemented several reforms to America’s prison and criminal justice systems, reducing sentences for certain non-violent offenders and improving prison programs to reduce recidivism, among other priorities. In announcing his support for the bill, Trump argued that it would “make our communities safer and give former inmates a second chance at life. According to reporting by Axios in 2020, Trump expressed regrets in private about having followed Jared Kushner's lead in going through with the First Step Act.

Middle East peace plan and Abraham Accords 

Trump put Kushner in charge of brokering peace in the Israeli–Palestinian conflict, despite the fact that Kushner had no foreign experience or experience in the Middle East. On August 24, 2017, Kushner traveled to Israel to talk to Prime Minister Benjamin Netanyahu (with whom Kushner has longstanding personal links and family ties, causing Palestinians to distrust him). He then traveled to Palestine to meet President Mahmoud Abbas in an attempt to restart a peace process in the Middle East.

Donald Trump formally unveiled a plan authored by Kushner in a White House press conference alongside Israeli prime minister Benjamin Netanyahu on January 28, 2020; while representatives from the United Arab Emirates, Bahrain, and Oman attended the event. Palestinian representatives were not invited. In an interview, Kushner said he had "been studying this now for three years", and that he had "read 25 books on it, I've spoken to every leader in the region, I've spoken to everyone who's been involved in this." The plan, which was endorsed by the Israeli government, offered the Palestinians a conditional path to an independent state with defined borders. It has been characterized as requiring too few concessions from the Israelis and imposing too harsh requirements on the Palestinians. Both the West Bank settlers' Yesha Council and the Palestinian leadership rejected the plan: the former because it proposed a path to a Palestinian state, the latter arguing it is too biased in favor of Israel. Reaction was muted among the Arab states, although Saudi Arabia, the UAE, Qatar, Bahrain, Egypt, Lebanon issued statements expressing appreciation for the effort. The proposal gave American approval for Israel to annex its settlements in the West Bank, contingent on Israel and the United States agreeing to a concrete map for the contested areas within the West Bank and Jerusalem.

After Yousef Al Otaiba, the UAE ambassador to the United States, wrote a June 2020 opinion piece warning that annexation of Israeli settlements in the occupied West Bank would threaten better relations between Israel and the Arab world, Kushner saw an opportunity and stepped in to facilitate talks. The talks led to the August establishment of diplomatic ties between the United Arab Emirates and Israel, normalizing what had long been informal relations between the two countries and ultimately becoming the first Abraham Accord, which was the first normalization agreement between Israel and an Arab country since it normalized relations with Jordan in 1994. As part of the agreement, Netanyahu suspended the annexation of West Bank settlements, which the Kushner peace plan had approved months earlier. The first commercial flight from Israel to the UAE later arrived in Abu Dhabi with a U.S.-Israeli delegation led by Kushner.

Hours after the August 13 announcement of the U.S.-brokered normalization agreements between Israel and the United Arab Emirates, senior Bahraini officials called Kushner with a message: "We want to be next". Over the next 29 days Kushner and aide Avi Berkowitz negotiated, and traveled to Bahrain, before closing the deal on September 11, 2020, in a call between Trump, Netanyahu and the king of Bahrain.

All three countries officially committed to the deals on September 15, 2020, with the signing of the Abraham Accords on the South Lawn of the White House.

On September 4, 2020, Kosovo, a Muslim-majority country, announced that it intended to normalize relations with Israel as part of an economic agreement the United States had brokered between it and Serbia. The negotiations were led by Ric Grenell, special envoy for Serbia and Kosovo peace negotiations, with support from Kushner.

On October 23, 2020, Israel and Sudan agreed to normalize ties, making Sudan the third Arab country to set aside hostilities in two months. The agreement was negotiated on the U.S. side by Trump senior adviser Jared Kushner, Middle East envoy Avi Berkowitz, national security adviser Robert O'Brien, Secretary of State Mike Pompeo and national security official Miguel Correa.

On December 10, 2020, President Trump announced that Israel and the Kingdom of Morocco agreed to establish full diplomatic relations. The agreement was negotiated by Trump senior adviser Jared Kushner and Middle East envoy Avi Berkowitz and marked Kushner and Berkowitz's fourth normalization agreement in as many months. As a component of the deal, the United States agreed to recognize Moroccan sovereignty over the Western Sahara.

On November 30, 2020, Kushner and Berkowitz traveled to Saudi Arabia for negotiations on the Qatar diplomatic crisis. The next day, Kushner continued to Qatar, but left Berkowitz in Saudi Arabia so the duo could continue to mediate the deal between the Saudis and the Qataris over the phone in real time. The negotiations led to a breakthrough, and on January 5, 2021, Kushner and Berkowitz attended the GCC Summit in Saudi Arabia, where the parties signed an agreement ending the Qatar diplomatic crisis. For his efforts in the Middle East, Kushner has twice been nominated for the Nobel Peace Prize.

US–Mexico–Canada Agreement 
Shortly after Trump assumed office, Kushner and several administration officials initiated discussions with the Mexican government around renegotiating NAFTA. In April 2017 reports surfaced that Trump intended to withdraw from the trade agreement. Working with counterparts in the Mexican and Canadian governments, Kushner convinced Trump to set aside these plans and instead enter into formal trade negotiations. When the Senate confirmed Robert Lighthizer as United States Trade Representative in May 2017, Lighthizer commenced formal negotiations, leading on the technical aspects of the discussions while Kushner managed the relationships with the Mexican and Canadian governments. On August 27, 2018, the United States and Mexico announced that they had reached a preliminary deal without Canada. A month later, Canada announced that it intended to join the deal as well. At a press conference in the Rose Garden on September 30, 2018, Lighthizer stated that the $1.3 trillion trade deal “would not have happened” without Kushner’s efforts. In recognition of these efforts, President Peña Nieto awarded Kushner the Order of the Aztec Eagle, Mexico’s highest honor granted to a non-Mexican citizen, calling Kushner a “grand ally” of Mexico and an “important actor” in the U.S.-Mexico relationship.

COVID-19 pandemic actions and response 

Amid the COVID-19 pandemic, Kushner was an influential advisor to President Trump, and shaped the administration's actions. At Trump's order, Kushner set up what has been described as a "shadow task force," separate from the official coronavirus task force chaired by Vice President Mike Pence. The Kushner operation was staffed by a dozen young volunteers from the private sector; they worked out of offices on the seventh floor of the Health and Human Services building. Their first assignment was to facilitate the search for medical supplies and protective equipment, with their performance receiving criticism for favoritism shown to Trump associates. According to The Washington Post, numerous rudimentary initiatives proposed by Kushner interrupted the work of other government officials who were seeking to manage the U.S. response to the coronavirus pandemic. The New York Times reported that one way that Kushner was seeking advice on how to deal with the coronavirus outbreak was to ask his brother's father-in-law, a physician, for recommendations. The physician then proceeded to crowdsource advice on a Facebook group for physicians.

Early on during the outbreak, Kushner advised Trump that the media was exaggerating the dangers of the coronavirus outbreak; at the time, Trump downplayed the dangers of the coronavirus. Kushner helped write the Oval Office address that President Trump gave to the nation on March 11, 2020, along with Trump's advisor Stephen Miller. Drafts of the address were not shared with any of the staff working on the coronavirus task force or with the agencies dealing with the coronavirus response, and Kushner, Miller and Vice President Pence (who joined the writing process later on) were still working making edits to the draft shortly before Trump gave the address. The Washington Post wrote that the address that Kushner, who had "zero expertise in infectious diseases and little experience marshaling the full bureaucracy behind a cause", helped write was "widely panned". In the address, Trump blamed Europeans and the Chinese for the virus, describing the virus as a "foreign virus". During the address, Trump inaccurately said "all travel from Europe" would be prohibited, and that the travel prohibitions would apply to goods. The speech caused markets to plunge, as White House aides had to clarify what the actual policy was. European leaders said they were blindsided by the address. The speech set off panic among Americans abroad who had to scramble to learn whether they could return to the United States and under what circumstances; this created chaos at airports in Europe and the United States. Trump reportedly blamed Kushner for the widely panned address, telling aides that he should not have listened to Kushner.

Kushner also helped put together a March 13 Rose Garden event where Trump falsely claimed that Google was "quickly developing" a website that could help test people for coronavirus. Google later clarified their involvement, stating that the website would initially serve the Bay Area. Trump also announced a project intended to set up testing sites across parking lots across the United States, taking the state and federal health care workers who oversee the project by surprise. These drive-through testing sites were later used to support distribution of the coronavirus vaccine. On March 30, 2020, The Atlantic reported that a website that Trump had said would help Americans to diagnose themselves and direct them to a nearby coronavirus testing site in a March 13 press conference had been a project between the government and Oscar Health, a company that Kushner had ties with. Kushner's brother, Joshua, co-founded and owns Oscar Health, and Kushner himself was a partial owner of the firm before joining the White House. The website was quickly scrapped.

In April 2020, Kushner made a rare public appearance, when in the White House briefing room he defended the administration's response to the coronavirus pandemic. In response to requests by state and local governments that the federal government distribute medical supplies to the states, Kushner said, "The notion of the federal stockpile is that it's supposed to be our stockpile. It's not supposed to be states' stockpiles that they then use." The Strategic National Stockpile page on the Public Health Emergency website was retconned on the same day to reflect this new interpretation of its mission.

In late April 2020, the Department of Defense revealed that the federal government had less than 10,000 ventilators remaining in the strategic national stockpile, far short of the anticipated need. At that time, Governor Andrew Cuomo projected that New York would need 37,000 ventilators. New Jersey, Louisiana, and Michigan also requested thousands of ventilators. The Trump administration, however, refused to empty the stockpile to fulfill these requests, claiming that the states needed far fewer than they were projecting. Kushner described the administration's response to the coronavirus as "a great success story." During the pandemic, Kushner relied on a team of volunteers from consulting and private equity firms who had little relevant experience in dealing with a pandemic. Kushner described the volunteers as "true patriots." The team was intended to assist in procuring PPE, but the team struggled to do so. The New York Times wrote that the search for supplies was "fumbling" and that "personal relationships and loyalty are often prized over governmental expertise, and private interests are granted extraordinary access and deference." Kushner's volunteer team advised senior officials in New York that Yaron Oren-Pines, a Silicon Valley engineer, could produce 1,000 ventilators. New York officials assumed that the team had vetted him and gave him an $86 million contract to produce the ventilators; no ventilators were produced.

In May 2020, Kushner reportedly told those involved in the coronavirus response that the coronavirus was under control and that there would not be a second wave. By June 2020, cases were surging in the United States. It was revealed that businesses owned by the Kushner family obtained coronavirus relief, which raised concerns with potential conflicts of interests due to Kushner's White House role.

In August 2020, when 170,000 had died from the coronavirus in the United States, Kushner reiterated his claim from April 2020 that the administration's response had been a "success story."

2020 election aftermath 
Kushner did not participate in the Trump administration's attempts to overturn the 2020 United States presidential election.  Rather than fight Mr. Giuliani and Sidney Powell for president Trump's attention, he started writing a memoir, made plans to move his family to Miami, and focused on his project of Middle East diplomacy.

He met with Biden administration security advisors Jake Sullivan and Jeffrey Zients to prepare for transition of power.

When vice presidential advisor Marc Short requested his help in reasoning with president Trump, Kushner replied that the vice president “is a big boy,” and if he disagreed with the president on a legal issue, he should bring in his lawyers.  He stated “I'm too busy working on Middle East peace right now, Marc.”

During the January 6th 2021 United States Capitol attack, he was returning from a diplomatic trip around the Persian gulf states.

On 11 January 2021, he arranged a meeting between vice-president Mike Pence and Donald Trump to try to reconcile their relationship.

On 31 March 2022, he voluntarily spoke to the United States House Select Committee on the January 6 Attack for six hours. He was the highest-ranking Trump administration official interviewed to date, as well as the first Trump family member to be interviewed.

Post-Trump administration

Affinity Partners Private Equity Investment Fund 
Kushner's firm received commitments of more than $3 billion by the end of 2021 to invest in American and Israeli companies that are expanding in India, Africa, the Middle East and other parts of Asia.  Investors include $2 billion from the Saudi public investment fund, with Kushner stating that he hopes to open an "investment corridor between Saudi Arabia and Israel", seen internationally as a "sign of warming ties between two historic rivals".

Within the Trump administration, Kushner had been a staunch defender of Saudi ruler Mohammed bin Salman. In 2021, Kushner started an investment firm, Affinity Partners. He sought funds for the new company through the sovereign wealth funds of Gulf countries. Advisers for the Public Investment Fund, the Saudi government's sovereign wealth fund, expressed several concerns about the transaction—including the inexperience of Affinity management, the degree of risk to be assumed by the Saudi kingdom, an "excessive" management fee, and a finding that Affinity's operations were "unsatisfactory in all aspects". However, PIF management overruled them and invested $2 billion in Kushner's firm, only six months after Kushner had left the White House. The firm primarily depended on Saudi money, as, by April 2022, it only had $2.5 billion under its management. According to ethics experts, the investment created the appearance of potential payback for Kushner. The House Oversight Committee said on June 2, 2022, that it had opened an investigation into whether Kushner had traded on his government position to get the deal.

The fund plans to invest Saudi money into startup companies in Israel. According to the Wall Street Journal, "The decision marks the first known instance that the Saudi Public Investment Fund’s cash will be directed to Israel, a sign of the kingdom’s increasing willingness to do business with the country, even though they have no diplomatic relations."

Political Memoir: Breaking History 
Kushner wrote a memoir, Breaking History: A White House Memoir, that was published in August 2022.

Foreign Policy and Political Commentary 
In March 2021 he claimed that we are witnessing the last vestiges of the Arab-Israeli conflict, and praised the foreign policy of the Joe Biden administration in its handling of China and Iran, in an op-ed published by the WSJ, that generated some responsa from the political class.

He wrote "This negotiation is high-stakes and, thanks to his policies, America holds a strong hand. Iran is feigning strength, but its economic situation is dire and it has no ability to sustain conflict or survive indefinitely under current sanctions... America should be patient and insist that any deal include real nuclear inspections and an end to Iran's funding of foreign militias."

“The Biden administration, however, has one asset that the Trump administration never had—a relationship with Iran. While many were troubled by the Biden team’s opening offer to work with Europe and rejoin the Iran deal, known as the Joint Comprehensive Plan of Action, I saw it as a smart diplomatic move,” Kushner wrote. “The Biden administration called Iran’s bluff. It revealed to the Europeans that the JCPOA is dead and only a new framework can bring stability for the future. When Iran asked for a reward merely for initiating negotiations, President Biden did the right thing and refused.”

“The table is set. If it is smart, the Biden administration will seize this historic opportunity to unleash the Middle East’s potential, keep America safe, and help the region turn the page on a generation of conflict and instability,” he wrote.

He also appeared in the 2022 documentary Unprecedented.

Controversies

Allegations of nepotism 
Kushner's appointment as Trump's senior advisor in the White House in January 2017 was questioned on the basis of a 1967 anti-nepotism law which forbids public officials from hiring family members, and explicitly one's son-in-law, in agencies or offices they oversee. The law was passed in response to President John F. Kennedy's decision to appoint his brother, Robert F. Kennedy, as attorney general in 1961. However, on January 20, 2017, the Department of Justice Office of Legal Counsel issued an opinion stating the anti-nepotism law does apply to appointments within the White House, after Kushner's lawyer, Jamie Gorelick claimed the 1967 law does not apply to the White House because it is not an 'agency'. Among other precedents, the OLC opinion invoked a 1993 D.C. Circuit Court ruling that enabled Hillary Clinton to serve within the White House during the Clinton administration. Kushner was sworn in on January 22, 2017 and was given the office which is physically the closest to the Oval Office.

Security clearance

On January 18, 2017, immediately after his appointment as senior advisor to President Trump, Kushner requested Top Secret security clearance, using "Standard Form 86 (SF86): Questionnaire for National Security Positions". The request omitted all of Kushner's contacts with foreign officials, including the meetings with Kislyak and Gorkov, though he quickly updated his filing to notify government officials that he would supplement his disclosure to provide the required information. Failure to disclose pertinent contacts can cause security clearances to be declined or revoked, and an intentional failure to disclose can result in imprisonment. Kushner's lawyers said that the omissions were "an oversight", and that "a member of [Kushner's] staff had prematurely hit the 'send' button" before the form was completed.

By July 2017, Kushner had updated his SF86, this time disclosing contacts with foreign nationals. This was the first time that government officials were made aware of the June 2016 Trump campaign–Russian meeting and Kushner's role in it.

On September 15, 2017, Carl Kline, the director of the personnel security office within the Executive Office of President Trump, recorded Kushner as having an interim Top Secret/SCI security clearance. Kushner and his wife were among at least 48 officials granted interim clearance giving them access to sensitive compartmented information (SCI): detailed accounts of intelligence sources and methods.

On February 27, 2018, in response to the Rob Porter scandal, White House chief of staff John Kelly downgraded Kushner's interim security clearance to "secret" status, along with other White House staffers working with interim security clearances. White House sources said that part of the reason Kushner had not yet been granted permanent security clearance was that he was under investigation by Robert Mueller.

Kushner finally received permanent Top Secret security clearance on May 23, 2018. In January 2019, Trump told The New York Times that he had not intervened to grant Kushner's security clearances. On February 8, 2019, Kushner's wife Ivanka also denied that Trump had intervened to grant her or Kushner's security clearances. However, on February 28, 2019, CNN (citing three anonymous sources) and The New York Times (citing four anonymous sources) reported that in May 2018 Trump ordered Kelly to grant Kushner a top-secret clearance, which Kelly contemporaneously documented in an internal memo. Reportedly, this was the first time any U.S. president had intervened in such a way. Carl Kline later testified before the House Oversight and Government Reform Committee that there had been no external intervention in the decision to restore Kushner’s clearance.

Conflicts of interest 

While serving in the Trump administration, Kushner retained ownership of businesses, which drew criticism from government ethics experts who said it created conflicts of interest.

After his appointment as Senior Advisor to Donald Trump (in January 2017), Kushner resigned as head of his family's real-estate firm, Kushner Companies, and partially divested himself of some of its assets, including all his stake in Thrive Capital, a venture capital firm co-founded by his brother, all common stock holdings and over 35 other investments, and his stake in 666 Fifth Avenue. However, he did not actually sell off his assets or set up a blind trust with outside management. Instead, he transferred ownership of some of his assets to his brother and to a trust overseen by his mother rather than selling off his assets to a third party or setting up a blind trust with outside management. The New York Times reported that Kushner managed to retain "the vast majority of his interest in Kushner Companies. His real estate holdings and other investments are worth as much as $761 million." Disclosures he was required to make show that Kushner still receives millions of dollars a year in income from rent collected by his assorted real estate portfolio.

After her father was elected president, global sales of Ivanka Trump merchandise surged. On April 6, 2017, the same day that Kushner and Ivanka dined with Chinese president Xi Jinping and his wife at a dinner hosted by the president at Mar-a-Lago, the Chinese government provisionally approved three new trademarks for the Ivanka Trump brand giving it monopoly rights to sell Ivanka Trump brand jewelry, bags and spa services in the world's second-largest economy. Ivanka applied for the trademarks in 2016 due to concerns about the proliferation of knock off and counterfeits goods being sold under her name in China as her father’s presidential campaign progressed.

Use of WhatsApp for White House duties 
While a White House official, Kushner used WhatsApp to conduct government business. This raised concerns among cybersecurity experts who said this left his communications vulnerable to potential exploitation by foreign governments and hackers. Saudi crown prince Mohammed bin Salman was reportedly one of the individuals that Kushner contacted through WhatsApp; in January 2020, UN investigators said that there was evidence that the bin Salman was involved in the hacking of Jeff Bezos's phone through WhatsApp communications, which led to warnings that Kushner should stop using WhatsApp. Kushner reportedly used WhatsApp to communicate with his coronavirus team during March and April 2020. Ethics watchdogs have since confirmed that Kushner turned over his WhatsApp records prior to departing the White House, and that these records have been acquired in full by the National Archives and Records Administration.

Secret Service protection 
Jared Kushner was in the list of 13 family members and nearly three Cabinet appointees, who were granted security for additional six months after Donald Trump left the White House, a dispensation which had also been granted to Sasha and Malia Obama.

In May 2021, Kushner used the taxpayers' money to visit Abu Dhabi, United Arab Emirates. It was nearly six months after Trump lost the position as the US President. The US State Department used at least $12,950 for Kushner's Secret Service security team that accompanied him. For that, a total of 50 "room nights" at $259 each were booked between May 5 and 14 at Abu Dhabi's Ritz-Carlton hotel. The extra-luxurious hotel was selected as per Kushner's decision, citing the requirement of high security. On the other side, ethics watchdogs viewed the financial links between Kushner and the UAE as a threat, citing that former Senior Advisor to the US President was believed to be "particularly manipulable" by the UAE. Even a month before Trump left office, Kushner's last overseas trip cost the US taxpayers around $24,335 in hotel costs alone.

Personal life

Kushner has a younger brother, Joshua, and two sisters, Dara and Nicole. He married Ivanka Trump in a Jewish ceremony on October 25, 2009. They had met in 2005 through mutual friends. Kushner and his wife (who converted to Judaism in 2009) are Modern Orthodox Jews, keep a kosher home, and observe the Jewish Shabbat. They have three children, a daughter born in July 2011 and two sons, born in October 2013 and March 2016.

In 2004, Kushner's father pleaded guilty to eighteen felony counts of tax fraud, election violations, and witness tampering. (He retaliated against his own sister who was a cooperating witness in the case.) The case against Charles Kushner was prosecuted by Chris Christie, who later became Governor of New Jersey and, for a period was part of Donald Trump's election campaign team in 2016. Christie subsequently claimed that Jared Kushner was responsible for having him fired as revenge for sending his father to prison.

In 2017, federal disclosures suggested Kushner and his wife had assets worth at least $240 million, and as much as $740 million. They also have an art collection, estimated to be worth millions, that was not mentioned in the financial disclosures initially. The United States Office of Government Ethics has said that the updated disclosures comply with the regulations and laws.

He was diagnosed with thyroid cancer in October 2019 and underwent treatment for it during the Trump Administration, he recounts in his political memoir. In August 2022 he underwent a second thyroid surgery.

Honors
Foreign honors

 : Grand Cordon of the Order of Ouissam Alaouite from King Mohammed VI
 : Sash of the Order of the Aztec Eagle (2018)
 : Commander's Cross of the Hungarian Order of Merit (2022)

Domestic honors

 National Security Medal
 Department of Defense Medal for Distinguished Public Service

Selected publications

See also
Kushner family
Mueller Report
Links between Trump associates and Russian officials
Special Counsel investigation (2017–present)
Russian interference in the 2016 United States elections

References

External links 

 "Citizen Kushner" – article in The New York Times, June 24, 2011
 
 Here's Jared Kushner's Full Statement to Congress

Further reading

 
 

1981 births
Living people
21st-century American businesspeople
American chairpersons of corporations
American chief executives
American company founders
American financiers
American investors
American newspaper publishers (people)
American Orthodox Jews
American people of Belarusian-Jewish descent
American political fundraisers
American real estate businesspeople
American technology company founders
Businesspeople from New Jersey
Businesspeople from New York City
Frisch School alumni
Harvard University alumni
Jewish American government officials
Jared
The New York Observer people
New York University School of Law alumni
New York University Stern School of Business alumni
Paul, Weiss, Rifkind, Wharton & Garrison people
People from Kalorama (Washington, D.C.)
People from Livingston, New Jersey
Senior Advisors to the President of the United States
Trump family
Commander's Crosses of the Order of Merit of the Republic of Hungary (civil)